Amangeldi is a district of Kostanay Region in northern Kazakhstan. The administrative center of the district is the selo of Amangeldi. Population:

References

Districts of Kazakhstan
Kostanay Region